Relations between the Arab Republic of Iraq and State of Palestine have historically been close, with Palestinian Liberation Organization supported by the Ba'athist Iraqi regime during the second half of the 20th century, and vice versa, Iraqi Ba'athist regime supported by PLO leadership during the Gulf War. The State of Palestine has an embassy and consulate in Baghdad and Arbil accordingly, but Iraq doesn't have an embassy in Palestine.

History 
Iraq declared war on the newly established Jewish state of Israel in 1948; since then, relations between the two states have remained hostile. Iraq has strongly supported the cause of the Palestinians since then.
Iraq sent armies to fight Israel in 1948 and 1967. Iraq also sent troops to provide back-up for Syria's armed forces in the Yom Kippur War in 1973.

Saddam Hussein was widely revered in Arab nations for his anti-Israel stance and has supported several Palestinian guerrilla and militant organisations, and during the last Second Intifada, Iraq subsidized families of Palestinian martyrs. In 1991, Hussein's army fired 39 Scud missiles at Israel. However, Israel did not retaliate, and no further action has been taken from either side since.

According to British author Nigel Ashton, Israeli Prime Minister Yitzhak Rabin sent a message to Saddam Hussein through King Hussein of Jordan requesting a meeting between him and Saddam. Rabin hoped peace with Iraq might encourage Iran and Syria to do the same. Rabin was assassinated on November 4, 1995, ending the contact between governments. Rabin had previously supervised Operation Bramble Bush, a failed 1992 plan to assassinate Saddam with Sayeret Matkal commandos.

Former Iraqi Prime Minister Ayad Allawi said in 2004 that Iraq would not reconcile its differences with Israel.

During the 2008–2009 Israel-Gaza conflict, the Iraqi government condemned the attack, stating that: "the Iraqi government demands a halt to the military operations, that civilians’ lives are not unnecessarily exposed to danger and requests that the international community honour its responsibilities and take the required measures to stop the attack". The Dawa Party of Prime Minister Nouri al-Maliki called on Islamic countries to cut relations with Israel and end all "secret and public talks" with it.
Also the Iraqi Shia leader Ali al-Sistani has called for decisive action by Arab and Muslim states for an end to Israeli attacks on Gaza. Though he condemned the operation, he stated that "supporting our brothers only with words is meaningless, considering the big tragedy they are facing." After the 2010 Gaza flotilla raid, an Iraqi government official, MP Khairallah al-Basri (a member of current premier Nouri al-Maliki's State of Law Coalition), condemned the attack and described it as a "new humanitarian disaster" as well as "a violation of human rights and a breach of international standards and norms." On July 1, 2012, Iraqi Prime Minister Nouri al-Maliki said that Iraq will establish diplomatic relations with all sovereign United Nations member states except Israel. He said that Iraq does not discriminate against any country but he rejected the idea of establishing any cultural, economic, military, or political ties with the Jewish state.
During the November 2012 Operation Pillar of Defense in the Gaza Strip, Iraq's envoy to the Arab League called on the Arab countries to "use the weapon of oil, with the aim of asserting real pressure on the United States and whoever stands with Israel".

See also 
 Iraq-Israel relations
 Palestinians in Iraq

References

External links 
 JORDAN'S CHANGING RELATIONS WITH IRAQ

 
Bilateral relations of the State of Palestine
Palestine